The "Szózat" (in English: "Appeal" or "Summons") is a Hungarian patriotic song. It is considered as a second national anthem of Hungary, beside the Himnusz. Usually only its first two stanzas are sung at national celebrations. The official anthem is sung at the beginning of ceremonies, and Szózat is sung at the end.

It was written in 1836 by Mihály Vörösmarty, and was set to music in 1840 by Béni Egressy for the award of András Bartay, head of the national theatre. It was first performed at 10 May 1843, in the National Theatre. There was a long debate in that era whether Szózat or Himnusz would be chosen as the national anthem.

Comparison to Himnusz 
The title of Vörösmarty's work defines the situation: it is a speech, oration of a raconteur (the poet) to the Hungarian people. Although the Szózat of Vörösmarty touches similar thoughts as the poems of Ferenc Kölcsey, even as continuing his train of thought, its intonation is entirely different. Himnusz (Hymn) is a prayer, but Szózat acts rather like a speech, addressing the listener/reader by the narrator in the role of an orator. Furthermore, as a prayer, Himnusz becomes almost a begging for the last verse, while Szózat is much more uplifting, unfaltering, inspiring for patriotism and loyalty. However, it also reckons with the concerns of Himnusz, sees the death of the nation as a possibility: 'Or it will come, if it must come, The glorious death'. At the same time it finds possible the coming of a better era: 'There yet shall come … that better, fairer day'. The poem deals with the past in three, with the future in six verses.

Lyrics 
It was translated to English by Watson Kirkconnell, a Canadian writer and academic.

Notes

References

Hungarian culture
Hungarian patriotic songs
1836 songs
1840 compositions
Compositions in E-flat major